Kristin Blystad-Bjerke (born 7 July 1980) is a Norwegian footballer who played as a striker for Kolbotn of the Toppserien and Norway women's national football team.

Club career
Blystad-Bjerke started her career playing for Kolbotn in 1997. Later on, she moved to Denmark to play for Idrætsklubben Aalborg Freja for a couple of years, then to return eventually to Kolbotn in 2002.

After over 200 games and around 60 goals, she was released in 2008, the same year when she was the club's top scorer with 13 goals.

International career
Blystad-Bjerke played for the Norway women's team, in which she got a silver medal after finishing second in the UEFA Women's Euro 2005, coming at 87th minute in the final against Germany.

Personal life
In January 2009, Blystad-Bjerke married national team-mate Trine Rønning, shortly after same-sex marriage in Norway was made legal.

References

1980 births
Living people
Norway women's international footballers
Norwegian women's footballers
Kolbotn Fotball players
Toppserien players
Norwegian LGBT sportspeople
LGBT association football players
Women's association football forwards